Kill City is a studio album by American musicians Iggy Pop and James Williamson, both formerly of the rock band the Stooges. It was recorded as a demo in 1975 but released in altered form in November 1977 by record label Bomp!.

Background 
"Johanna" and "I Got Nothin'" were both performed live during 1973–74 by the Williamson-era Stooges.

Recording 
Kill City was originally recorded in 1975 after the disintegration of the Stooges. It was to be used as a demo to give to record labels in hopes of getting Pop a new contract. His vocals were recorded on weekends when he received permission to leave a mental hospital he was staying in at the time for treatment of his long-standing heroin addiction.

The original 1975 "demo" mix of the album remains unheard, with the exception of three tracks which have been released on various compilations (including A Million in Prizes: The Anthology and Original Punks): "Johanna", "Consolation Prizes" and "Kill City". These tracks sound markedly different from those on the final version of the album, with different guitar parts and, in the case of "Johanna", no saxophone.

Pop biographer Paul Trynka said that rock writer Ben Edmonds "played the first mixes to Seymour Stein in late January 1975".

Release 
There would be no takers for the album until 1977 when, following the success of Pop's solo albums The Idiot and Lust for Life, Williamson got an advance from Bomp! to release the album, some of which was used to fund studio time to finish off the original recordings by adding overdubs and remixing.

The master tapes were lost shortly after the release of the original album and all subsequent CD releases were mastered from the original poor quality green vinyl pressing. This partly accounts for the somewhat muddy sound of the album.

Pop appeared as himself, performing the album's title track, on the "For Cryin' Out Loud" episode of the Tales from the Crypt TV series, aired on May 22, 1990.

In 2010, Williamson and engineer Ed Cherney remixed the album once more from the original multitracks. The resulting mixes formed a new version of the album, released on Bomp! on October 19, 2010.

Reception 

Kill City has been generally well received by critics. Nick Kent of New Musical Express called it "a great album".

Mark Deming of AllMusic called the album "a minor triumph", writing: "The music is more open and bluesy than on Raw Power, and while Williamson's guitar remains thick and powerful, here he's willing to make room for pianos, acoustic guitars and saxophones, and the dynamics of the arrangements suggest a more mature approach after the claustrophobia of Raw Power". Martin Aston of BBC Music praised the album, calling it "Iggy's most underrated album" and one that "helped him get back to real life".

Legacy 
The Wire placed Kill City in their list of "100 Records That Set the World on Fire (While No One Was Listening)".

Track listing 
All songs written by Iggy Pop and James Williamson, except "Master Charge", by Williamson and Scott Thurston.

Side one
 "Kill City" – 2:20
 "Sell Your Love" – 3:36
 "Beyond the Law" – 3:00
 "I Got Nothin'" – 3:23
 "Johanna" – 3:03
 "Night Theme" – 1:20

Side two
 "Night Theme (Reprise)" – 1:04
 "Consolation Prizes" – 3:17
 "No Sense of Crime" – 3:42
 "Lucky Monkeys" – 3:37
 "Master Charge" – 4:33

Personnel 

 Iggy Pop – vocals
 James Williamson – guitar, backing vocals
 Scott "Troy" Thurston – keyboards, bass guitar ("Kill City", "Beyond the Law", "Johanna" and "Night Theme"), backing vocals, special effects, harmonica
 Brian Glascock – drums, congas, African beaters, backing vocals, guiro
 Steve Tranio –  bass guitar ("Sell Your Love", "I Got Nothin'" and "No Sense of Crime")
 Tony "Fox" Sales – backing vocals and bass ("Lucky Monkeys" and "Master Charge")
 Hunt Sales – backing vocals and drums ("Lucky Monkeys" and "Master Charge")
 John "The Rookie" Harden – saxophone
 Gayna – backing vocals on "Night Theme"

 Technical
 James Williamson - production, mixing
 Peter Haden, Tony Gottlieb - assistant engineers
 David Allen – album cover

References

External links 

 

Iggy Pop albums
1977 albums
Radar Records albums
Albums produced by James Williamson (musician)